Kanitz Nunatak (‘Nunatak Kanitz’ \'nu-na-tak 'ka-nits\) is the rocky peak rising to 659 m in the southern foothills of Laclavère Plateau on Trinity Peninsula, Antarctic Peninsula.  Situated 8.43 km south of Ami Boué Bluff, 9.81 km east-southeast of Dabnik Peak, 6.15 km north of Cain Nunatak and 9.84 km west by south of Theodolite Hill.  Overlooking Broad Valley to the south.

The peak is named after the settlement of Kanitz in northwestern Bulgaria, in connection with the Austro-Hungarian geographer and ethnographer Felix Kanitz (1829–1904).

Location
German-British mapping in 1996.

Maps
 Trinity Peninsula. Scale 1:250000 topographic map No. 5697. Institut für Angewandte Geodäsie and British Antarctic Survey, 1996.
 Antarctic Digital Database (ADD). Scale 1:250000 topographic map of Antarctica. Scientific Committee on Antarctic Research (SCAR). Since 1993, regularly updated.

Notes

References
 Bulgarian Antarctic Gazetteer. Antarctic Place-names Commission. (details in Bulgarian, basic data in English)
 Kanitz Nunatak. SCAR Composite Antarctic Gazetteer

External links
 Kanitz Nunatak. Copernix satellite image

Nunataks of Trinity Peninsula
Bulgaria and the Antarctic